Nick Gates (born 10 March 1972 in Sydney) is an Australian former professional road bicycle racer.

In 1996 Gates won the Commonwealth Bank Classic and the Australian national road race title.

Gates twice competed in the Tour de France, riding for the Lotto-Domo team, but failed to finish either event, pulling out after the 15th stage in 2003 and after the first stage in 2004.

His career ended with a fairytale victory in his self-named event, the Nick Gates Classic, in Townsville in 2008, where he won with the assistance of long-time teammate, Robbie McEwen.

Major results

1996
 1st  Road race, National Road Championships
 1st  Overall Commonwealth Bank Classic
1997
 1st Stage 1 Tour of Tasmania
1998
 1st Stage 12 Commonwealth Bank Classic
1999
 3rd Overall Tour of Japan
1st Stage 3
2000
 1st Harsewinkel
2001
 1st Gold Coast-Nerang  
 1st Neuss
2004
 1st Burleigh
2006
 1st Surfers Paradise
2007
 1st Stage 1b (TTT) Settimana Ciclistica Internazionale Coppi-Bartali
2008
 1st Nick Gates Classic

Tour de France results
2003 – DNF
2004 – DNF

References

External links

1972 births
Living people
Australian male cyclists
Australian track cyclists
Cyclists from Sydney
20th-century Australian people
21st-century Australian people